Georg Schewe (24 November 1909 – 16 September 1989) was a German officer with the Kriegsmarine during World War II. He was a recipient of the Knight's Cross of the Iron Cross.

Awards 
 Wehrmacht Long Service Award 4th Class (2 October 1936)
 Iron Cross (1939)  2nd Class (20 December 1939) & 1st Class (13 June 1940)
 Sudetenland Medal (20 December 1939)
 U-boat War Badge (1939) (24 January 1940)
 Knight's Cross of the Iron Cross on 23 May 1941 as Kapitänleutnant and commander of U-105

References

Bibliography 

 
 
 

1909 births
1989 deaths
U-boat commanders (Kriegsmarine)
Recipients of the Knight's Cross of the Iron Cross
Reichsmarine personnel
People from Vorpommern-Greifswald
People from the Province of Pomerania
Military personnel from Mecklenburg-Western Pomerania